MI6 is the United Kingdom's Secret Intelligence Service.

MI-6 or MI6 may also refer to:
 AMD's MI6, a brand of deep learning oriented Graphics Processing Units, see Radeon Instinct
 Mil Mi-6, a Soviet built transport helicopter
 Michigan's 6th congressional district
 M-6 (Michigan highway)
 MI6.co.uk, former website of the media-website MI6-HQ.com
 Mission: Impossible – Fallout, a 2018 spy-thriller film starring Tom Cruise
 Xiaomi Mi 6, a smartphone developed by Xiaomi
 Return to Monkey Island (also known as Monkey Island 6), videogame

See also
 M16 rifle